, also known as , is a mythical creature with the head of a tiger and the body of a human in the Meitei mythology and folklore of Manipur. He is often described as half man and half tiger. 

Legend says he was once a skilful priest named Kabui Salang Maiba. With his witchcraft, he transfigured himself into the form of a ferocious tiger. As a punishment of his pride, he could not completely turn back to his original human form.

Story 
Keibu Keioiba was human in daytime and tiger during nighttime. During night, he wandered around for food in his tiger form. One night, he came across an old woman's house. He was to devour her. The old woman said that her wrinkled skin would not be tasty. She suggested him a neighbourhood's young beautiful lady named "Thabaton" in her place. Thabaton was the only sister in a family with seven brothers. The old woman informed Keibu Keioiba about the absence of the seven brothers at home. The brothers had gone for a work for a very long time. Keibu Keioiba was instructed some tricks by the old woman. The trick was to open the door of Thabaton's house. As instructed by the old woman, Keibu Keioiba did so. At first, he failed. But at the second time, he succeeded to make Thabaton open the door. Keibu Keioba forcefully took Thabaton away from her house.
Meanwhile after the incident, the seven brothers returned home from their work. They found Thabaton missing in the house. They asked the old woman about their sister. She told them that Keibu Keioiba had taken her away. The seven brothers prepared their weapons. They set out in search for their sister. On the other hand, Keibu Keioiba did not eat Thabaton. Instead, he made Thabaton his wife. They lived together in the woods. The seven brothers never stopped searching for their sister in the woods. One day, they saw Thabaton. When they came close to her, they saw a man and a baby with her. The brothers gave a signal to Thabaton about their arrival. When Keibu Keioiba went away for a hunt, Thabaton met her brothers. They planned to escape from that place. When Keibu Keioiba returned, Thabaton gave him an Utong (bamboo pipe). The Utong was hollow on both the sides. She told Keibu Keioiba to fetch some water from the stream with that Utong. Keibu Keioiba went out to fetch water with the hollow Utong. In Keibu Keioiba's absence, the seven brothers burnt the house of Keibu keioiba and killed the baby. They ran away with their sister. On the other hand, Keibu Keioiba could not fetch the water with the Utong. Whenever he fetched water, the water leaked afterwards. A crow was observing his activities from a treetop. The crow said, "Keibu Keioiba Naning Namang Hotrong Ho, Natu Leima Kangkok". The crow's statement indicates the foolish nature of Keibu Keioiba and the escape of his prisoner-wife. The crow said it multiple times. Keibu Keioiba noticed the crow's strange statement. So, he quickly returned home. When he reached home, he found his burned house, his dead son and his wife missing. His anger knew no bound. So, he charged towards the house of Thabaton. The seven brothers were already aware that Keibu Keioiba would come back. So, they were all prepared with their weapons. As soon as Keibu Keioiba came towards them, they fought Keibu Keioiba with their weapons. Finally, Keibu Keioiba died at the hands of the seven brothers. After the death of Keibu Keioiba, Thabaton and her seven brothers lived happily ever after.

Movie character 

In the 2009 Meitei language animation film Keibu Keioiba (Tiger Head), the character of Keibu-Kei-Oiba was uniquely designed to a humanoid tiger, which had to speak dialogues in human voices. The facial structure of the character was twisted out of the normal shape of a real tiger to a little bit extend. It was done so as to bring adjustment to the human voice and the speaking actions during digitalization. 
Artist Bhumenjoy faced great challenges in making the visual character of Keibu Kei-Oiba, as the character is about the combination of a human and a beast. Various faded colours were used by the drawing team to adapt to the story.

In contemporary culture 
 Keibu Keioiba (Tiger Head), a 2009 Meitei language animation film, was produced, featuring the legend of Keibu Keioiba.

  (Yamata-no-Orochi and Keibu Keioiba) is a Meitei language play that interweaves the stories of the two legendary creatures, Yamata-no-Orochi of Japanese mythology and Keibu Keioiba of Meitei mythology (Manipuri mythology). The role of Keibu Keioiba was firstly played by Kshetrimayum Priyobrata and then secondly played by Pangambam Tyson Meitei.

Similar characters 
 Beast of the Beauty and the Beast is often compared to Keibu Keioiba
 Ravana, a demon in Hindu mythology, who abducted lady Sita
 Yamata no Orochi, a beast in Japanese mythology

See also 
 Werewolf
 Manticore

References

External links 
 
 
 

Keibu Keioiba
Fictional kidnappers
Fictional tigers
Meitei folklore
Meitei literature
Meitei mythology
Mythological human–animal hybrids
Mythological rapists